The Snoop Sisters is an American comedy-mystery television show that aired on NBC during the 1973–1974 season, airing on a monthly rotation (referred to as a "wheel") as part of the NBC Wednesday Mystery Movie, sharing the timeslot with Banacek, Tenafly, and Faraday and Company. Of these series, only Banacek demonstrated any longevity.

The show stars Hollywood film actresses Helen Hayes and Mildred Natwick as two elderly sisters, Ernesta Snoop and Gwendolyn Snoop Nicholson, who routinely stumbled across mysteries, which they solve.  The series followed the 1971 ABC television movie Do Not Fold, Spindle or Mutilate, which also starred Hayes and Natwick working together as amateur sleuths, along with Myrna Loy and Sylvia Sidney.  A pilot for the series, also titled The Snoop Sisters, but later retitled "The Female Instinct", aired on December 16, 1972 on NBC.

Guest stars during the series' brief run include Joan Blondell, Jill Clayburgh, Alice Cooper, William Devane, Tammy Grimes, George Maharis, Roddy McDowall, Eve McVeagh, Geraldine Page, Walter Pidgeon, Vincent Price, Fritz Weaver and, in her final screen appearance, Paulette Goddard.

Synopsis
Predating Murder, She Wrote, Ernesta was a mystery novelist, while her widowed sister Gwendolyn (known as "G") wrote the stories from Ernesta's dictation. G was also a writer, but of poetry, having had one book of poetry published. Her late husband was named George, and G fancied he resembled Melvyn Douglas. The sisters lived in a townhouse on Gramercy Park in New York City and travel in a 1920's Lincoln sedan. They were assisted in their investigations by Barney, their chauffeur and caretaker, played by Art Carney in the pilot and Lou Antonio in the series, and somewhat reluctantly by their nephew, NYPD Lieutenant Ostrowski, played by Lawrence Pressman in the pilot and Bert Convy in the series.

Cast
 Helen Hayes as Ernesta Snoop
 Mildred Natwick as Gwendolyn Snoop Nicholson
 Lou Antonio as Barney
 Bert Convy as Lt. Steve Ostrowski

Episode list

Reception
Both Natwick and Hayes were nominated for Emmy Awards for their work on the program. Natwick won.

DVD releases
Visual Entertainment released The Snoop Sisters: The Complete Series on DVD in Canada on March 15, 2011; and in the U.S. on June 7, 2011. Madman Entertainment released the complete series on DVD in Australia (Region 4) on March 16, 2011.

References

External links
 

1973 American television series debuts
1974 American television series endings
1970s American crime drama television series
American detective television series
English-language television shows
NBC Mystery Movie
NBC original programming
Television series by Universal Television
Television shows set in New York City